Révoil is a French surname. It may refer to:

 Fanély Revoil (1906–1999), French opera and operetta singer
 Henri Révoil (1822–1900), French architect
 Pierre Révoil (1776–1842), French painter in the troubadour style
 Paul Révoil (1856–1914), French diplomat and administrator